Edmond Brion (1885 Soissons - 1973) was a French architect active in Casablanca during the French Protectorate.

Biography 
After World War I and after having studying at the École des Beaux-Arts in Paris in the Paulin studio, Brion settled in Casablanca and worked with Auguste Cadet through the mid 1930s.

His two major works are the Bendahan Building (1935) located at November 16 Square in Derb Omar, and Casablanca's branch of the State Bank of Morocco (1937), featuring a large hall of marble, Art Deco metalwork, and exceptional reinterpreted zeliij.

References

20th-century French architects
1885 births
1973 deaths
French expatriates in Morocco